Deconstructing Harry is a 1997 American black comedy film written, directed by, and co-starring Woody Allen, alongside Caroline Aaron, Kirstie Alley, Bob Balaban, Richard Benjamin, Eric Bogosian, Billy Crystal, Judy Davis and others. The film tells the story of a successful writer named Harry Block, played by Allen, who draws inspiration from people he knows in real life, and from events that happen to him, sometimes causing these people to become alienated from him as a result.

The central plot features Block driving to a university from which he was once thrown out, in order to receive an honorary degree. Three passengers accompany him on the journey: a prostitute, a friend, and his son, whom he has kidnapped from his ex-wife. However, there are many flashbacks, segments taken from Block's writing, and interactions with his own fictional characters. Deconstructing Harry received moderately positive reviews from critics.

Plot
One night, Lucy gets a taxi to the home of author Harry Block. She has just read Harry's latest novel. In the novel, the character Leslie is having an affair with her sister's husband Ken. Lucy is angry because the novel is patently based on her and Harry's own affair; as a result, everyone knows about it. Lucy pulls a gun out of her purse, saying she will kill herself. She then turns the gun on Harry and begins firing. She chases him out onto the roof. Harry insists that he has already been punished: his latest girlfriend Fay has left him for his best friend Larry. To distract Lucy, Harry tells her a story he is currently writing: a semi-autobiographical story of a sex-obsessed young man named Harvey who is mistakenly claimed by Death.

In therapy, Harry realizes he has not changed since he was a sex-obsessed youth. Harry discusses the honoring ceremony at his old university, taking place the next day; he is particularly unhappy that he has nobody with whom to share the occasion. After the session, Harry asks his ex-wife Joan if he can take their son Hilliard to the ceremony. She refuses, stating that Harry is a bad influence on Hilliard. She is also furious at Harry for the novel he wrote. In it, the character Epstein marries Helen, but the marriage begins to crumble after the birth of their son.

Harry runs into an acquaintance, Richard, who is worried about his health. After accompanying Richard to the hospital, Harry asks him to come to the university ceremony. Richard appears uninterested.  Harry then goes to meet his ex-girlfriend Fay, who reveals that she is now engaged. Harry begs Fay to get back together with him. He asks Fay to accompany him to his ceremony, but it clashes with Fay's wedding, scheduled the following day.

That night, Harry sleeps with a prostitute, Cookie. Harry then asks Cookie to accompany him to his ceremony.

In the morning, Richard unexpectedly arrives to join Harry and Cookie on the journey. On a whim, Harry decides to "kidnap" his son Hilliard. Along the way, they stop at a carnival, then at Harry's half-sister Doris's. Doris, a devoted Jew, is upset by Harry's portrayals of Judaism in his stories, as is her husband. During the journey, Harry also encounters his fictional creations Ken and Helen, who force him to confront some painful truths about his life. Just before arriving at the university, Richard dies peacefully in the car.

While filming, Harry's fictional alter ego, Mel literally slides out of focus, becoming blurred.  The university's staffers gush over Harry, asking what he plans to write next. He describes a story about a man (based on himself) who journeys down to Hell to reclaim his true love (based on Fay) from the Devil (based on Larry).  Harry and the Devil engage in a verbal duel as to who is truly the more evil of the two.  Harry gets as far as arguing that he is a kidnapper before the story is interrupted by the arrival of the police.  Harry is arrested for kidnapping Hilliard, for possessing a gun (it was Lucy's), and for having drugs in the car (belonging to Cookie).

Larry and Fay come from their wedding to bail Harry out of jail. Harry reluctantly gives them his blessings. Back at his apartment, a miserable Harry fantasizes that the university's ceremony is taking place. The film ends with Harry getting over his writer's block by starting to write a book about a man who, like him, can only function in art, not in his life.

Cast
Woody Allen as Harry Block
Richard Benjamin as Ken, Harry's Character
Kirstie Alley as Joan, Harry's second wife
Billy Crystal as Larry, Harry's friend / The Devil
Judy Davis as Lucy, Jane's sister
Bob Balaban as Richard
Julie Kavner as Grace
Elisabeth Shue as Fay Sexton, Harry's last girlfriend
Tobey Maguire as Harvey Stern, Harry's character
Jennifer Garner as Woman in the elevator, Harry's character
Paul Giamatti as Prof. Abbott
Stanley Tucci as Paul Epstein, Harry's character
Julia Louis-Dreyfus as Leslie, Harry's character
Mariel Hemingway as Beth Kramer
Robin Williams as Mel, Harry's Character
Hazelle Goodman as Cookie Williams
Eric Bogosian as Burt, Harry's brother-in-law
Demi Moore as Helen, Harry's character
Caroline Aaron as Doris Block, Harry's sister
Eric Lloyd as Hilliard Block, Harry's son
Amy Irving as Jane, Harry's third wife
Viola Harris as Elsie
Victoria Hale as Woman in Shoestore 
Hy Anzell as Max Pincus, Harry's character
Shifra Lerer as Dolly Pincus, Harry's character

Casting

Woody Allen offered the role of Harry Block to Elliott Gould, Dustin Hoffman, Dennis Hopper and Albert Brooks, all of whom turned it down. Allen took the role himself.

Reception
Deconstructing Harry garnered a 73% approval rating on Rotten Tomatoes from 37 reviews and a 61 out of 100 on Metacritic.

Soundtrack

Twisted (1952) - Music by Wardell Gray - Performed by Annie Ross
Out of Nowhere (1931) - Music by Johnny Green - Lyrics by Edward Heyman - Performed by Django Reinhardt
The Girl from Ipanema (1962) - Music by Antonio Carlos Jobim - Lyrics by Vinicius de Moraes - Performed by Stan Getz
She's Funny That Way (1928) - Music by Neil Moret - Lyrics by Richard A. Whiting - Performed by Erroll Garner
Waiting (1993) - Written by Glenn Dickson - Performed by the Shirim Klezmer Orchestra
All the Things You Are (1939) - Music by Jerome Kern - Lyrics by Oscar Hammerstein II
Mussorgsky: Night on Bald Mountain (1867) - Written by Modest Mussorgsky - Performed by Orchestre de la Suisse Romande
The Way You Look Tonight (1936) - Music by Jerome Kern - Lyrics by Dorothy Fields - Performed by Erroll Garner
Rosalie (1937) - Written by Cole Porter - Performed by The Savoy Hotel Orpheans
Miami Beach Rumba (1946) - Written by John A. Camacho, Irving Fields and Albert Gamse
Tzena Tzena Tzena (1950) - Written by Mitchell Parish, Issichar Miron and Julius Grossman
Sing Sing Sing (With a Swing)(1936) - Written by Louis Prima - Performed by Benny Goodman
Christopher Columbus (1936) - Music by Leon Berry - Lyrics by Andy Razaf - Performed by Benny Goodman
I Could Write a Book (1940) - Music by Richard Rodgers - Lyrics by Lorenz Hart - Performed by The Stebbins Hall Band
Dream a Little Dream of Me (1931) - Music by Wilbur Schwandt and Fabian Andre - Lyrics by Gus Kahn

Awards and nominations
Woody Allen was nominated for the Academy Award for Best Writing, Screenplay Written Directly for the Screen. The film was nominated for the Satellite Award for Best Motion Picture — Comedy or Musical.

Influences
The film is a general reworking of his earlier 1980 film Stardust Memories, which also had an artist go to a ceremony in his honor, while reminiscing over past relationships and trying to fix and stabilize current ones.

Allen is  an admirer of several renowned European directors, and his films in particular often draw upon the works of Ingmar Bergman and Federico Fellini.  The rough outline of the plot of Deconstructing Harry, that of an academic on a long drive to receive an honorary award from his old university while reflecting upon his life's experiences, essentially mirrors that of Bergman's Wild Strawberries.  Also, the film is similar to Fellini's 8½, in that it is about an artist struggling with his current relationships and remembering his old ones, interspersed with dream sequences, as well as his work being based on events from his life.

It is acknowledged by some critics that Allen based the name of Harry Block on Antonius Block (Max von Sydow), the protagonist from Bergman's The Seventh Seal. Some critics, including Roger Ebert, have suggested that the character of Harry Block is based on real-life author Philip Roth and not on Allen himself.

References

External links

1990s sex comedy films
Films with atheism-related themes
American satirical films
American sex comedy films
American black comedy films
Films about death
Films about Jews and Judaism
Films about prostitution in the United States
Films about writers
Films directed by Woody Allen
Films shot in New Jersey
Films shot in New York City
Buena Vista International films
Hollywood Pictures films
American nonlinear narrative films
1990s comedy road movies
American comedy road movies
Films with screenplays by Woody Allen
Films about adultery in the United States
Films produced by Letty Aronson
Films produced by Jean Doumanian
1997 comedy films
1997 films
1990s English-language films
1990s American films